Bolesławice  is a village in the administrative district of Gmina Bolesławiec, within Bolesławiec County, Lower Silesian Voivodeship, in south-western Poland.

History 
Originally, there was a tribal stronghold built by a Silesian tribe called Bobrzanie, followed by the Piast castellany until the 13th century. The first mention of the existence of the village dates back to 1274. In 1840 there were 200 houses in the village, including: a manor farm, an Evangelical church with a school, a Catholic church, 4 inns and a sandstone quarry. Among the inhabitants there were 28 different craftsmen and 4 traders. In 1864, there were 172 houses in Bolesławice, and among the inhabitants there were: 18 wealthy people, 36 homesteads, 101 smallholders, 4 weavers, 28 different craftsmen and 4 traders. In July 1945 a mine explosion took place in the local manor farm called Tillendorf. Six people died, including Bolesław Kubik, the first mayor of Bolesławiec. In 1978 there were 48 agricultural farms here, rising to 74 in 1988. In 2011, there were 590 registered residents.

Name etymology 
The name of the village derives from the old Polish male name Bolesław meaning great glory.

Historical sites 
According to the register of the National Heritage Board of Poland, the following places are included in the list of historic monuments:
 The parish church of St. Mary of the Rosary, dating back to the 14th-16th century,
 The church cemetery, dating back to the 15th-18th century.

References

Villages in Bolesławiec County